Percy Chamburuka (born 19 February 1995), known professionally as Jafaris, is a Zimbabwean-born Irish rapper, singer and songwriter. He began his career as an actor in the comedy-drama film Sing Street (2016), before making his professional solo musical debut with the EP Velvet Cake (2017). Jafaris rose to prominence with his debut studio album Stride (2019), which was later nominated for the Choice Music Prize.

Early life 
Percy Chamburuka was born on 19 February 1995 in Zimbabwe. At the age of six, he moved to Tallaght, Dublin, where he was raised and attended Old Bawn Community School. He began training as a dancer at age 10 and stopped at approximately age 16 or 17. He was already "on course for a career as a dancer" when he became interested in singing and songwriting at the age of 15.

Career

2015–2016: Sing Street and Diffusion Lab beginnings 
In 2015, Chamburuka began touring with Irish rap duo Hare Squead and performing under the stagename Jafaris, which he had developed through a random name generator application. It was also during this time that he began working with and through Diffusion Labs, which has been described as "a 'collaborative hub' which functions as a label and studio, and enlists writers, musicians and in-house producers." Later in 2017, Jafaris would be considered "one of its core acts". Chamburuka made his acting debut playing the role of Ngig in the musical coming-of-age comedy-drama film Sing Street (2016). The film would later be an upset nominee for the Golden Globe Award for Best Motion Picture – Musical or Comedy at the 74th Golden Globe Awards.

2017–2018: Solo debut with Velvet Cake 
Jafaris released his debut single, "Love Dies", alongside its own music video in February 2017. The song was described as a "vocal-lead cut of  hazy R&B" which was "mightily impressive". On 21 April 2017, Jafaris released his debut EP Velvet Cake. To support its release, he performed at festivals such as Forbidden Fruit, and Hard Working Class Heroes. Jafaris also performed with the RTÉ National Symphony Orchestra as part of the Story of Hip Hop at Electric Picnic in 2017 and then again in 2018. He represented Ireland at the Eurosonic Festival in 2018.

2019–present: Stride 
Jafaris independently released his debut studio album, Stride, on 8 March 2019, with support from the preceding singles "Found My Feet", "Time" and "Invisible". It was well-received by local critics, and ended up being shortlisted for the Choice Music Prize which is annually awarded to the Irish Album of the Year. Jafaris featured on British singer Joy Crookes' single "Early" in October 2019. The single debut atop the UK's Asian Music Top 40 chart, before the two artists subsequently performed it on Later... with Jools Holland in November 2019. Jafaris released the singles "Glue" and "Haunted" in 2020, which supported his second EP I Love You But I'm In A Bad Mood which was released on 6 November 2020.

Discography

Studio albums

Extended plays 

 Velvet Cake (2017)
 I Love You But I'm In A Bad Mood (2020)

Singles

As lead artist

As featured artist

Filmography

Film

Television

Awards and nominations

References 

Living people
1995 births
21st-century Irish people
Black Irish people
Irish rappers
Musicians from Dublin (city)
Zimbabwean emigrants to Ireland